Visual Smalltalk Enterprise (VSE) is a Smalltalk dialect that runs only on Microsoft Windows, and is the last in a long line of Smalltalk implementations first produced by Digitalk and now available through Cincom.

Active development has stopped since late 1997 and VSE is now only available as a version called VSE 2000, and only to licensed users of previous VSE versions.

History

VSE has had a complicated history which starts with a product called Digitalk Smalltalk/V that ran from a DOS prompt and provided a windowing environment.

 Smalltalk/V (1986, MS-DOS)
 Smalltalk/V 286 (1988, MS-DOS)
 Smalltalk/V PM (1989, Presentation Manager under OS/2)
 Smalltalk/V Win (1991, Windows 3.x)
 Visual Smalltalk Enterprise (VSE) (1992, Windows 3.x)
 Visual Smalltalk Enterprise 3.0 (1995, Windows 95)

Before Smalltalk/V, the first commercial Smalltalk product from Digitalk was Digitalk Methods released in 1983. The windowing interface was not graphically based - instead it drew its windows using special symbols stored in a character format. Further, it predated the use of a mouse to drive the interface.

There have also been versions of Smalltalk/V for the Apple Macintosh and IBM OS/2 operating systems. A version for OS/2 was also available for VSE.

In July 1995 ParcPlace and Digitalk merged, later renaming the company to ObjectShare, and in 1997 the company announced it was moving away from Smalltalk and focus towards Java.

PARTS Workbench 
Visual Smalltalk Enterprise usually comes with another sub-system called the PARTS Workbench. This system allows the layout of components, which can then be connected using a visual representation of event-message links. Programmers can add scripts to particular components and build nested-components. They can also enhance the functionality of the main VSE Smalltalk system and use that within the PARTS Workbench.

Although the PARTS Workbench allows very easy development of small systems (somewhat after the style of Visual Basic) it is argued that it encourages fragmentary development. The natural style of using this system tends to lead to many links and scripts - it is not based around the idea of 'model' (as used in 'Model–View–Controller' approaches common in many Smalltalks as well as in other languages). However, as an 'HCI' for programmers, the PARTS Workbench has many features that are not in modern Smalltalks. It has an immediacy that makes it very good for introductory teaching and for rapidly implementing programs with visual interfaces.

Copyrights, licensing

A result of the complex history is that the copyright and licensing situation is unclear and a typical recent VSE development environment is made up of many elements many of which were developed by third parties and sold separately but are now included with the distribution.

The situation with the most recent release (VSE 2000) is:

People
A partial list of people that worked at Digitalk/ParcPlace on VSE:

External links
The VSE Mailing List: VSWE-L
Seagull Software Systems, Inc.
Cincom Page about VSE:http://www.cincomsmalltalk.com/userblogs/cincom/blogView?content=vse
Threads of discussion about copyright and licensing:
comp.lang.smalltalk Apr. 2005
Smalltalk web ring Smalltalk products and services.
 Welcome to the Visual Smalltalk Knowledge Base! 
 Goodies at  Smalltalking web site.
 Goodies at Totally Objects.
 Goodies at 360 Business Tool.

References 

Smalltalk programming language family